The 2016 World Series of Darts was a series of non-televised darts tournaments organised by the Professional Darts Corporation. There were 6 World Series events and one Final event being held – one in the United Arab Emirates, one in New Zealand, one in China, one in Japan, two in Australia, with the finals being held in Scotland.

Prize money

World Series events

World Series qualifiers 

Auckland Masters
  Warren Parry 
  Cody Harris 
  Damon Heta 
  Rob Szabo 
  Ken Moir 
  Tic Bridge 
  Bernie Smith 
  Stuart Leach 

Shanghai Masters 
  Yuanjun Liu 
  Shiyan Lai 
  Lihao Wen 
  Jianhua Shen  

Tokyo Masters 
  Keita Ono
  Haruki Muramatsu 
  Masahiro Hiraga 
  Seigo Asada 
  Masumi Chino
  Tsuneki Zaha 
  Shintaro Inoue
  Chikara Fujimori  

Sydney Masters
  Simon Whitlock
  Kyle Anderson 
  David Platt 
  Corey Cadby 
  Rob Szabo 
  Rhys Mathewson 
  Cody Harris 
  Harley Kemp 

Perth Masters 
  Simon Whitlock
  Kyle Anderson
  Corey Cadby
  Adam Rowe
  Kim Lewis
  David Platt
  Rob Szabo
  Koha Kokiri

Quarter-finalists

References 

World Series of Darts